The Iran Premier Beach Soccer League is a professional beach soccer league, run by the Football Federation Islamic Republic of Iran. At the top of the Iranian Beach Soccer System, it is the country's primary competition for the sport.

The Iran Premier Beach Soccer League is recognized as one of the best leagues in the world and is the only professional beach soccer league which has a home and away format.

Format
10 teams compete in the league where each team plays each other twice for 18 total games played for each team. At the end of the season, two teams are relegated to League 1.

Current clubs

References

External links

Beach soccer competitions
National beach soccer leagues
Beach soccer in Iran